Traci Des Jardins is an American chef and restaurateur who previously owned Jardinière, a French influenced California fine-dining restaurant in the Hayes Valley neighborhood of San Francisco, California. She is also chef and partner of Public House, a sports pub serving local, sustainable classic pub food in Oracle Park in San Francisco, School Night in San Francisco, and El Alto in Los Altos.

Biography
Des Jardins was raised on a farm in Firebaugh, California, near Fresno. Her father is of French Acadian descent, and her mother's family is from the Mexican state of Sonora. Her maternal grandparents, Angela and Miguel Salazar, lived in a small house nearby, and Des Jardins has many strong childhood memories of her grandmother preparing flour tortillas. The Des Jardins' dinner table featured produce from the garden and game from the land in dishes which reflected her family's Mexican and Louisianan-French Acadian heritage.

Des Jardins apprenticed at several three-star French restaurants, including La Maison Troisgros, and was executive chef at Joachim Splichal's Patina in Los Angeles. Later, she worked at notable San Francisco restaurants Aqua, Elka, and Rubicon before opening Jardinière in 1997.

She is openly lesbian.

Philosophy

Des Jardins uses locally sourced, organic, seasonal ingredients whenever possible, and prefers sourcing from smaller, sustainable farming and ranching operations.

Awards
In 2007, Des Jardins won the James Beard Foundation Award for best chef in the Pacific region. In 1995, she was named the James Beard Foundation's "Rising Star Chef of the Year". She has won Food & Wine magazine's "Best New Chef" title, and San Francisco magazine's "Chef of the Year" award. Jardinière was named Esquire magazine's "Best New Restaurant", and was also nominated as a "Best New Restaurant" by the James Beard Foundation.

Television appearances

Traci Des Jardins competed on season 3 of Top Chef: Masters, which debuted April 6, 2011; she was a runner-up. She also appeared on an episode of Iron Chef America in 2005, in which she defeated Mario Batali. Later, she competed in The Next Iron Chef but was eliminated in the first episode.

Traci Des Jardins was also a judge on season 18 of Hell's Kitchen during a challenge in episode 4.

Traci Des Jardins has also appeared as a judge on Guy's Grocery Games - $12 Meal Showdown.

Restaurants

Active 
 Public House (2010–present), Oracle Park, San Francisco
 School Night (2018–present), Dogpatch, San Francisco

Closed 

 Jardinière (September 1997–April 2019), San Francisco
 Mijita Cocina Mexicana (2004–December 29, 2019), Ferry Building, San Francisco
 Mijita (2010–2015), Oracle Park, San Francisco
 Commissary (May 2014–2021), Presidio, San Francisco
 Arguello (2014–2021), Presidio, San Francisco
 Transit Café (April 2015–November 2019), Presidio, San Francisco, closed for the construction of the Presidio Tunnel Tops project.
 El Alto (2022), State Street Market, Los Altos, California

References

External links
 

Living people
American chefs
American women restaurateurs
American restaurateurs
Cuisine of the San Francisco Bay Area
American women chefs
James Beard Foundation Award winners
1967 births
21st-century American women
Lesbian entertainers
LGBT chefs
American LGBT entertainers
People from Fresno County, California
Chefs from California
People from San Francisco
Chefs from San Francisco